Abolfazl Jalili (born 1957 in Saveh, Iran) is an Iranian film director and screenwriter. He belongs to the Iranian new wave movement.

Jalili studied directing at the Iranian College of Dramatic Arts, then worked for national television (IRIB), where he produced several children's films. His 'Det' Means Girl (1994) won prizes in Venice film festival and Nantes. He was one of Rotterdam's Film Makers in Focus in 1999.

Filmography
 1983 Milad
 1985 Spring
 1987 Scabies
 1994 Det Means Girl
 1996 A True Story
 1992-1998 Dance of Dust
 1998 Don
 1999 Tales of Kish (The Ring)
 2001 Delbaran
 2003 Abjad
 2005 Full or Empty
 2007 Hafez (Iran-Japan / 35 mm / colour / 98min.)

Representative awards and honors 
 Golden Montgolfiere, Nantes Three Continents Festival, 2001.
 Golden Palm, nominated, 1999 Cannes Film Festival.
 Don Quixote Award, Locarno International Film Festival, 1999.
 Silver Leopard, 51st Locarno International Film Festival, 1998.
 Solidarity Prize, San Sebastián International Film Festival, 1998.
 Golden Montgolfiere, Nantes Three Continents Festival, 1996.
 Golden Osella, Venice Film Festival, 1995.
 Golden Lion, nominated, Venice Film Festival, 1991.

References

External links 
Delbaran - Diamond in the Rough (TCM's Movie Morlocks)

Iranian film directors
1957 births
Living people
Persian-language film directors
People from Saveh